Chen Feng (born 28 January 1980) is a Chinese fencer. He competed in the individual and team sabre events at the 2004 Summer Olympics.

References

External links
 

1980 births
Living people
Chinese male sabre fencers
Olympic fencers of China
Fencers at the 2004 Summer Olympics
Fencers from Jiangsu
Asian Games medalists in fencing
Fencers at the 2002 Asian Games
Asian Games silver medalists for China
Medalists at the 2002 Asian Games
20th-century Chinese people
21st-century Chinese people